The variable cat snake (Telescopus variegatus) is a species of snake of the family Colubridae.

Geographic range
The snake is found in Africa.

References 

Telescopus
Reptiles of Africa
Reptiles described in 1843